Donnie Spragan, Jr. (born July 12, 1976) is a former American football linebacker. He was signed by the New Orleans Saints as an undrafted free agent in 1999.  Spragan has also been a member of the Green Bay Packers, Cleveland Browns, Denver Broncos, Miami Dolphins, and Buffalo Bills.  He played college football at Stanford and Pacific.

Early years
Spragan attended James Logan High School in Union City, California, where he lettered in football, basketball, and baseball. In football, he won All-League honors at both quarterback and linebacker.  Spragan attended University of the Pacific in Stockton, CA, and played football there for Chuck Shelton.  When Pacific dropped their program after the 1995 season, Spragan transferred to Stanford University.

Professional career

Early career
Spragan signed as undrafted free agent with the New Orleans Saints but was released after he injured his knee during pre-season. He spent the 1999 and 2000 seasons recovering from injury.

He signed as free agent with the Amsterdam Admirals of NFL Europe, where he started all ten games and posted 44 tackles, 3,5 sacks, 2 forced fumbles and 5 special teams tackles.
He was then picked up by the Green Bay Packers on July 19, but was released on September 2 at the end of the preseason.
He was added to the Cleveland Browns' practice squad on October, 2, but was released from the practice squad on October 31.

Denver Broncos
Spragan was signed to the Denver Broncos' practice squad on December 11, 2001. He remained there through the end of the season, and was then re-signed by the Denver Broncos in the offseason He was active for the entire 2002 season, posting 12 tackles in total of which 2 were assisted. He also forced a fumble.

Spragan appeared in all 16 games for the Denver Broncos in 2003. He was moved to strong safety for a game against the New England Patriots. He posted 54 tackles in total of which 10 were assisted, 3 passes defended, 1 forced fumble and 3 fumbles recovered for a total of 9 yards.

Spragan appeared in all 16 games for the Denver Broncos yet again in 2004, starting 14 at outside linebacker. He recorded a total of 67 tackles of which 22 were assisted, one sack, 5 passes defended, one forced fumble and one fumble recovered.

Miami Dolphins
Signed a two-year deal worth $2 million with the Miami Dolphins. Posted 53 tackles (38 solo), one sack, one interception, two passes defended and one forced fumble.

Appeared in all 16 games for the Miami Dolphins posting 50 tackles of which 22 were assisted, 1.5 sack, 3 passes defended, one forced fumble and one fumble recovered.

On April 25, 2007, he re-signed with the Dolphins.

Buffalo Bills
A free agent in the 2008 offseason, Spragan signed with the Buffalo Bills on August 2 after rookie linebacker Alvin Bowen suffered what appears to be a serious knee injury. He was released on August 30, 2008.

References

External links
Buffalo Bills bio
Denver Broncos bio

1976 births
Living people
Players of American football from Oakland, California
American football linebackers
Stanford Cardinal football players
New Orleans Saints players
Amsterdam Admirals players
Green Bay Packers players
Cleveland Browns players
Denver Broncos players
Miami Dolphins players
Buffalo Bills players